Anne, alternatively spelled Ann, is a form of the Latin female given name Anna. This in turn is a representation of the Hebrew Hannah, which means 'favour' or 'grace'. Related names include Annie.

Anne is sometimes used as a male name in the Netherlands, particularly in the Frisian speaking part (for example, author Anne de Vries). In this incarnation, it is related to Germanic arn-names and means 'eagle'.  It has also been used for males in France (Anne de Montmorency) and Scotland (Lord Anne Hamilton).

Anne is a common name and the following lists represent a small selection. For a comprehensive list, see instead: .

As a feminine name

Anne
 Saint Anne, Mother of the Virgin Mary
 Anne, Queen of Great Britain (1665–1714), Queen of England, Scotland, and Ireland (1702–07) and Great Britain (1707–14)
Queen consorts, in alphabetical order:
 Anne of Austria, Landgravine of Thuringia (1432–1462)
 Anne Neville (1456–1485), wife of King Richard III of England
 Anne of Brittany (1477–1514), Breton ruler, wife of both Charles VIII of France and Louis XII of France
 Anne Boleyn (c. 1501/1507–1536), second wife of King Henry VIII of England 
 Anne of Cleves (1515–1557), fourth wife of King Henry VIII
 Anne of Denmark (1574–1619), wife of King James VI and I of Scotland, England, and Ireland, 
 Anne of Austria (1601–1666), wife of Louis XIII of France, Regent of France 
 Anne Catherine of Brandenburg (1575–1612), wife of King Christian IV of Denmark and Norway
 Anne Marie d'Orléans (1669–1728), wife of King Victor Amadeus II of Sardinia
 Anne of Romania (1923–2016), wife of King Michael I of Romania
 Anne-Marie of Greece (born 1948), Queen of Greece, wife of King Constantine II
 Princess Anne (disambiguation), including:
 Anne of Denmark, Electress of Saxony (1532–1585), Danish princess from the House of Oldenburg
 Anne, Princess Royal and Princess of Orange (1709–1759), daughter of King George II, wife of William IV, Prince of Orange
 Anne of Orléans (1906–1986), Princess of France
 Anne of Bourbon-Two Sicilies (born 1938), wife of Infante Carlos, Duke of Calabria
 Anne, Princess Royal (born 1950), daughter of Queen Elizabeth II

 Anne Abayasekara (1925–2015), Sri Lankan Sinhala journalist
 Anne Applebaum (born 1964), American journalist
 Anne Archer (born 1947), American actress 
 Anne Askew (1521–1546), English writer, poet, and Protestant martyr
 Anne Bancroft (1931–2005), American actress 
 Anne Baxter (1923–1985), American actress 
 Anne Lilia Berge Strand (born 1977), Norwegian singer-songwriter, known as "Annie"
 Anne Berthelot (born 1957), French professor of Medieval literature studies
 Anne-Grethe Leine Bientie (born 1954), Norwegian writer and psalmist
 Anne Bonny (1702–1782?), Irish pirate 
 Anne Bosworth (1868–1907), American mathematician
 Anne Bourg (born 1987), Luxembourgish footballer
 Anne Bourguignon (1950–2019), French actress, filmmaker and political activist known as Anémone
 Anne Bourlioux, Canadian mathematician and indoor rower
 Anne Bradstreet (1612–1672), America's first published poet
 Anne Brontë (1820–1849), British novelist and poet
 Anne Isabella Byron, Baroness Byron (1792–1860), British peer, wife of Lord Byron
 Anne Byrn (born 1956), American cookbook author
 Anne Carson (born 1950), Canadian poet, essayist, and translator
 Anne Chislett (born 1942), Canadian playwright
 Anne Cox Chambers (1919–2020), American media proprietor and billionaire
 Anne V. Coates (1925–2018), British film editor
 Anne Consigny (born 1963), French actress
 Anne Conway (disambiguation), several people
 Anne Virginia Culbertson (1857-1918), American writer
 Anne Dacier (1654–1720), French scholar and translator of the classics
 Anne Seymour Damer (1749–1828), English sculptor
 Anne Daw, Australian environmental activist
 Anne DeGrace, Canadian fiction writer and illustrator
 Anne Teresa De Keersmaeker (born 1960), Belgian choreographer
 Anne Desclos (1907–1998), French journalist and novelist
 Anne Diamond (born 1954), British journalist and broadcaster
 Anne Distel (born 1947), French curator and art critic
 Anne Donovan (born 1961), American basketball player and coach
 Anne Dudek (born 1975), American actress
 Anne Dudley (born 1956), English composer, keyboardist, conductor and pop musician
 Anne Émond (born 1982), Canadian film director and screenwriter
 Anne Catherine Emmerich (1774–1824), German nun, mystic and stigmatic
 Anne Fletcher (born 1966), American choreographer and film director
 Anne Stella Fomumbod, Cameroonian women's rights activist
 Anne Fontaine (born 1959), French film director, screenwriter, and actress
 Anne Francine (1917–1999), American actress and cabaret singer
 Anne Francis (1930–2011), American actress 
 Anne Frank (1929–1945), German-Dutch diarist and Holocaust victim
 Anne Geddes (born 1956), Australian photographer and businesswoman 
 Anne Golon (1921–2017), French author
 Anne Grant (1755–1838), Scottish poet, author 
 Anne Haney (1934–2001), American actress
 Anne Hathaway (1556–1623), wife of William Shakespeare
 Anne Hathaway (born 1982), American actress 
 Anne Hébert (1916–2000) Canadian author and poet
 Anne Heche (1969–2022), American actress
 Anne Heggtveit (born 1939), Canadian alpine skier
 Anne Henning (born 1955), American speed skater
 Anne Hidalgo (born 1959), French politician, Mayor of Paris
 Anne Grete Holmsgaard (born 1948), Danish energy expert and politician
 Anne Holt (born 1958), Norwegian author, lawyer and former Minister of Justice
 Anne Hugon (born 1965), French historian and Africanist
 Anne Hutchinson (1591–1643), American religious dissenter 
 Anne Hyde (1637–1671), Duchess of York
 Anne Jackson (1925–2016), American actress
 Anne Jeffreys (1923–2017), American actress and singer
 Anne Judkins (born 1964), New Zealand race walker
 Anne Keothavong (born 1983), British tennis player
 Anne Kirkbride (1954–2015), English soap actress
 Anne Kremer (born 1975), Luxembourgish tennis player
 Anne Osborn Krueger (born 1934), American economist, deputy director of the IMF
 Anne Margiste (born 1942), Estonian actress
 Anne Morrow Lindbergh (1906–2001), American author and aviator
 Anne Birgitte Lundholt (born 1952), Danish politician and businessperson
 Anne McCaffrey (1926–2011), American-born Irish science fiction and fantasy writer
 Anne Hazen McFarland (1868–1930), American physician, editor 
 Anne Meara (1929–2005), American actress and comedian
 Anne Marie Louise d'Orléans, Duchess of Montpensier (1627–1693), French memoirist
 Anne Murray (born 1945), Canadian singer
 Anne-Sophie Mutter (born 1963), German violinist
 Anne-Louise-Germaine Necker (1766–1817), French writer and philosopher, known as Madame de Staël
 Anne Sofie von Otter (born 1955), Swedish mezzo-soprano
 Anne Parillaud (born 1960), French actress
 Anne Peichert (born 1996), French singer, songwriter and actress, known as Louane Emera
 Anne Peyroche, French biologist and geneticist
 Anne Provoost (born 1964), Flemish author
 Anne Quemere (born 1966), French sailor
 Anne Ramsey (1929–1988), American actress
 Anne Reid (born 1935), English actress
 Anne Revere (1903–1990), American actress
 Anne Rice (1941–2021), American author
 Anne Royall (1769–1854), American journalist 
 Anne Schedeen (born 1949), American television actress
 Anne Schilling, American mathematician
 Anne Sexton (1928–1974), American poet
 Anne Shirley (1918–1993), American actress
 Anne Simpson, Canadian poet
 Anne Smith (disambiguation), several people
 Anne Steele (1717–1778), English hymnwriter, essayist
 Anne Sullivan (1866–1936), American teacher and companion of Helen Keller
 Anne Sweeney (born 1957), American businesswoman, co-chair of Disney Media
 Lady Anne Tree (1927–2010), British philanthropist and prison visitor
 Anne Tyler (born 1941), American writer and literary critic
 Anne Veski (born 1956), Estonian pop singer
 Anne Watanabe 渡辺杏 (Anne/杏) (born 1986), Japanese model and actress, known as "Anne"
 Anne Winters (actress) (born 1994), American actress
 Anne Wizorek (born 1981), German journalist, author and feminist
 Anne Wood (singer) (1907–1998), British mezzo-soprano and opera administrator
 Anne Wood (born 1937), English children's television producer
 Anne Wolden-Ræthinge (1929–2016), Danish biographer, journalist and writer
 Anne Woolliams (1926–1999), English artistic director, ballet choreographer, dancer and teacher.

Ann
 Ann (singer) (born 1991), Taiwanese singer-songwriter
Ann Bancroft (born 1955), American author, teacher, adventurer and public speaker
 Ann Bollin (born 1960), American politician
 Ann Brashares (1967), American YA author
 Ann Cashion, American chef
 Ann R. Chaintreuil (born 1947), American architect
 Ann Mary Butler Crittenden Coleman (1813–1891), American author, translator
 Ann Curry (born 1956), American journalist
 Ann Donahue, television writer
 Ann Druyan (born 1949), American writer and producer
 Ann Dunham (1942–1995), American anthropologist
 Ann, Lady Fanshawe (1625–1680), English memoirist and cookery author
 Ann Flagg (1924–1970), African-American playwright, stage actress and drama teacher
 Ann Flora Froude Flashman (1911–1961), Australian veterinarian
 Ann Getty (1941–2020), American philanthropist
 Ann James (born 1952), Australian artist
 Ann James (artist) (1925 – 2011), English-born Canadian artist and educator
 Ann Hasseltine Judson (1789–1826), American foreign missionary
 Ann E. Kelley (1954–2007), American neuroscientist
 Ann Kenrick (born 1958), British charity worker
 Ann Lambert (born 1957), Canadian author and playwright
 Ann Lamont, American venture capitalist
 Ann Landers (1918–2002), pen name of American advice columnist Ruth Crowley and later, Esther Pauline Lederer
 Ann Lee (1736–1784), English church leader
 Ann Lewis Hamilton, American television producer and writer
 Ann-Margret (born 1941), Swedish-American actress, singer and dancer
 Ann Marks (1941-2016), British physicist and science communicator
 Ann M. Martin (born 1955), American children's author, known best for the Baby-sitters Club series
 Ann McCrory (born 1956), First Lady of North Carolina
 Ann Miller (1923–2004), American dancer, singer and actress
 Ann Mitchell (born 1939), British stage and television actress
 Ann Nardulli (1948–2018), American endocrinologist
 Ann Petry (1908–1997), American author and journalist
 Ann Putnam Jr. (1679–1716), witness at the Salem Witch Trials
 Ann Radcliffe (1764–1823), English author and pioneer of the Gothic subgenre
 Ann Reinking (1949–2020), American actor, dancer, and choreographer
 Ann Richards (1933–2006), American politician
 Ann Romney (born 1949), wife of American businessman and politician, Mitt Romney
 Ann E. Rondeau, American Navy admiral
 Ann Rule (1931–2015), American author
 Ann Sarnoff (born ca. 1962), American businesswoman
 Ann London Scott (1929–1975), American feminist
 Ann Smith (activist) (fl. 1682–1686), English political activist
 Ann Eliza Smith (1819–1905), American author
 Ann Sothern (1909–2001), American actress
 Ann Sullivan (animator) (1929–2020), American animator
 Ann Syrdal (1945–2020), American psychologist and researcher
 Ann Ter-Pogossian (1932–2022), American artist
 Ann Thongprasom (born 1976), Thai film and television actress, host and producer
 Ann Widdecombe (born 1947), British politician, author and television personality
 Ann Wilson (born 1950), American musician
 Ann Winsborn (born 1981), Swedish singer-songwriter

As a masculine name
 Anna of East Anglia (died 653/54), king of East Anglia
 Anne Bignan (1795–1861), French poet and translator
 Anne van der Bijl (1928–2022), Dutch Christian missionary
 Anne Casimir Pyrame de Candolle (1836–1918), botanist
 Anne Claude de Caylus (1692–1765), French antiquarian and proto-archaeologist
 Anne Danican Philidor (1681–1728), French musician, composer, founder, Concert Spirituel Tuileries 172–1791
 Anne Hamilton (1709–1748), Scottish nobleman
 Anne Chrétien Louis de Hell (1783–1864), French admiral
 Anne du Bourg (1521–1559), French magistrate
 Anne d'Escars de Givry (1546–1612), French Benedictine cardinal
 Anne-Louis Girodet de Roussy-Trioson (1767–1824), French Romantic painter
 Anne de Joyeuse (c.1560–1587), French admiral during the French Wars of Religion
 Anne Louis Henri de La Fare (1752–1829), French Roman Catholic cardinal and counter-revolutionary
 Anne de Montmorency (1493–1567), constable of France, soldier, statesman, and diplomat
 Anne de Noailles (d. 1678), first Duke of Noailles
 Anne Poulett (1711–1785), British Member of Parliament
 Anne Jean Marie René Savary (1774–1833), French general and diplomat
 Anne Hilarion de Tourville (1642–1701), French naval commander, Marshal of France
 Anne Sjerp Troelstra (1939–2019), Dutch mathematician and logician
 Anne Robert Jacques Turgot (1727–1781), French economist and statesman 
 Anne Vermeer (1916–2018), Dutch politician
 Anne Vondeling (1916–1979), Dutch politician
 Anne de Vries (1904–1964), Dutch writer from Drenthe

Fictional characters
 Ann, in the Story of Seasons video game franchise
 Ann, a hunter in the video game Identity V
 Anne Boonchuy, from the American animated TV series Amphibia
 Anne Brookes, on the American TV sitcom The Ropers
 Ann Darrow, in the films King Kong (1933) and King Kong (2005)
 Anne Elliot, in Jane Austen's Persuasion
 Anne Glass, in the American TV series Falling Skies
Anne Kirrin, the youngest of the four cousins in Enid Blyton's The Famous Five novels
 Anne Lester, a survivor in the video game Identity V
 Anne Lewis, in the Robocop franchise
 Anne Maria, from the Canadian animated TV series Total Drama: Revenge of the Island
 Anne Page, from William Shakespeare's The Merry Wives of Windsor
 Ann Perkins, from the American television series Parks and Recreation
 Anne Shirley, in Lucy Maud Montgomery's Anne of Green Gables
 Ann Takamaki, one of the main characters from video game Persona 5
 Raggedy Ann, rag doll in Johnny Gruelle's books, 1918 onwards
 Rebecca Anne "Annie" January, one of the main characters in The Boys franchise

See also
 Ann Arbor, Michigan
 Anne's theorem, result from Euclidean geometry, due to Pierre-Leon Anne (1806–1850)
 Lady Anne (disambiguation)
 Princess Anne (disambiguation)
 Queen Anne (disambiguation)
St Ann (disambiguation)
 Saint Anne (disambiguation)

References

Dutch feminine given names
English feminine given names
Estonian feminine given names
French feminine given names
Filipino feminine given names
German feminine given names
Modern names of Hebrew origin